Hieracium distendens is a species of flowering plant belonging to the family Asteraceae.

Its native range is Finland to northern European Russia.

References

distendens
Flora of Finland
Flora of North European Russia
Flora of Northwest European Russia
Plants described in 1906